Union Steam Ship Company of New Zealand Limited was once the biggest shipping line in the southern hemisphere and New Zealand's largest private-sector employer. It was incorporated by James Mills in Dunedin in 1875 with the backing of a Scottish shipbuilder, Peter Denny. Bought by shipping giant P&O around the time of World War I it was sold in 1972 to an Australasian consortium and closed at the end of the twentieth century.

History

James Mills
James Mills had worked for Johnny Jones and his Harbour Steam Company. After Jones’ death in 1869 Mills tried twice to float a Union Steam Ship Company of New Zealand Limited without attracting enough interest from local investors but in 1875 he found backing from Scottish shipbuilder Peter Denny in return for Union Steam Ship orders for Denny's Dumbarton shipyard. The Denny-built Hawea and Taupo, both then large by local standards, arrived in mid 1875 and entered service. Union Steam Ship took over the Harbour Steam Company's vessels on 1 July 1875.

Local competition
Union Steam Ship became a major shipping line dubbed "The Southern Octopus" with a near-monopoly on trans-Tasman shipping. It steadily mopped up trans-Tasman and coastal shipping businesses including Anchor, Canterbury Steam, Richardson & Co and Holm.

Trans-Tasman
From 1889 there was three-way competition between Union Steam Ship, Huddart Parker and Tasmanian Steam Navigation Company (TSNCo) on the Tasmanian routes (Melbourne – Launceston, Hobart – Melbourne and Hobart – Sydney). TSNCo did not have other routes to absorb their Tasmanian losses and was bought out by USSCo in 1891. The rivalry between USSCo and Huddart Parker lasted to 1895 despite an earlier agreement in 1893. There was undercutting of fares and there were steamers shadowing each other from port to port. USSCo's Rotomahana and Mararoa would sail alongside the Miowra and Warrimoo, with other ships like the Te Anau and Manapouri sailing before and after and bracketing the Huddart Parker ships. The 1895 agreement between the two lines pooled the Auckland-Sydney profits and losses; the Melbourne-Launceston profits were divided 4/7 to USSCo and 3/7 to Huddart Parker. The Sydney-Hobart passenger trade was excluded but the cargo and stock trade was divided 2/3 to USSCo and 1/3 to Huddart Parker. Mark Twain criticised travel conditions on a Union Company ship in 1897 in his travel book Following the Equator.

Mills was a UK resident after 1907 and died in London in 1936. By 1914 Union Steam Ship had 75 ships. It was the biggest shipping line in the southern hemisphere and New Zealand's largest private-sector employer.

P&O
In 1917 P&O shareholders were asked to confirm their directors' prior purchase of Union Steam Ship with the information that USSCo had a valuable coasting trade within New Zealand, connections with India and Australia and a line of steamers running between Australia, New Zealand and Canada. The Union Steam Ship fleet was described as 74 high class steamers with a tonnage of 237,860 and of an average age of 12 years. In November 1920, rumours surfaced that the head office of the company would shift from Dunedin to Wellington. At the end of 1920, it became known that the board of directors would remain in Dunedin, but that all headquarters staff would transfer to Wellington. The move happened in late 1921, with all head office functions in Wellington after the New Year holidays. About 70 staff transferred to Wellington, ending 46 years of Dunedin as the company's headquarters.

Norrie Falla
With the Dunedin staff came Norrie Falla as general traffic manager. He had joined as a boy in Westport in 1898 and finished his accountancy exams in 1906. In 1910 he was put in charge of the cargoes and movements of Union's 65-strong fleet. Falla volunteered immediately for service in the 1914—1918 first world war. He was promoted to lieutenant colonel in 1916 and returned to his former post in 1919. He succeeded David Aiken as general manager in March 1934 and was appointed chairman in January 1936 on the death of founder Sir James Mills.

Falla ordered two new passenger ships and began a steady renewal of cargo ships commissioning 11 ships between 1935 and 1939. 

Falla also took Union Company into airlines. First in 1934 into East Coast Airways and then Cook Strait Airways in 1935.

Australian National Airways ANA
Union in conjunction with Holyman's Airways and Huddart Parker set up an airline across Bass Strait which began business in September 1934. In 1935 they added Adelaide Steamship Company as a partner in the venture which was renamed Australian National Airways the following year.
 
Union took up a 20% interest on the formation of Australian National Airways in 1936.

Union Airways NAC
In 1935 Union Airways of New Zealand was formed by Union Steam Ship and it built an air service through New Zealand. Union Airways was nationalised by the government in 1947 and renamed National Airways Corporation. Union Travel remained a substantial operation as travel agents and tour operators.

Tasman Empire Airways TEAL Air New Zealand
Union was instrumental in establishing this business in particular by buying the first three flying boats which began operations in April 1940. TEAL became Air New Zealand.

Falla dies
During World War II, Falla returned to the army with the rank of brigadier. He was later based in London as New Zealand representative on the Ministry of War Transport. He joined the main board of P&O in 1944. On his way back to New Zealand aged 62 he suffered a cerebral haemorrhage and died at sea 6 November 1945.

P&O sell to TNT
Australian road transport business, Thomas Nationwide Transport, had a substantial road transport stake in New Zealand. With New Zealand investors TNT bought USSCo from P&O in 1971.

In 1990 Union Steam Ship operated seven ships, and was involved in ship management, tourism, real estate and other ventures. By 2000, the Union Bulk barge made its last voyage.

Brierley Investments
At the end of the 20th century Brierley Investments bought all the shares, broke Union Steam Ship into components and sold up what it could.

Union Steam Ship Company of New Zealand owned more than 350 ships and has been the subject of a number of books.

Ferries

Steamer Express Wellington to Lyttelton
Union Steam Ship began regular sailings between Wellington and Lyttelton in 1895 with the  making two round trips a week. In 1905 this became a daily service year round. In 1933 the name "Steamer Express" was adopted for the service. Over the years a number of ships were used, including two Maoris, two Wahines, two Rangatiras, and a Hinemoa.

 entered service in October 1966 and foundered and sank at the mouth of Wellington Harbour 18 months later in April 1968. The  entered service in 1972 and was withdrawn in 1976, bringing the Wellington–Lyttelton "Steamer Express" to an end.

Wellington to Picton
In what has been described as "a fatal mistake", the Union Steam Ship announced in 1956 that the Tamahine was to be withdrawn from the Wellington-Picton route in 1962 and unlikely to be replaced (despite an offer of a $3 million government loan). The designer of the replacement ferry the  recalled that, "The media said the whole thing was a red herring", adding, "In their view, if the Union Steam Ship Company couldn't make the service pay, Railways definitely couldn't."

Fleet

See also
 Union Airways of New Zealand — Union Line's airline subsidiary

Notes

Bibliography

External links

Cook Strait Ferry
Defunct shipping companies of the United Kingdom
Shipping companies of New Zealand
Transport companies established in 1875
New Zealand companies established in 1875